Thomas Hagen (born 5 July 1950) is a Swiss former bobsledder. He competed in the two man and the four man events at the 1976 Winter Olympics.

References

External links
 

1950 births
Living people
Swiss male bobsledders
Olympic bobsledders of Switzerland
Bobsledders at the 1976 Winter Olympics
People from Baden District, Aargau
Sportspeople from Aargau
20th-century Swiss people